Smithfield Township is one of fifteen townships in DeKalb County, Indiana. As of the 2010 census, its population was 1,613 and it contained 719 housing units.

History
Smithfield Township was named for Isaac B. Smith, a pioneer settler.

Geography
Cedar Lake is in this township.

Cities and towns
 Ashley (southeast three-quarters)
 Waterloo (north edge)

Unincorporated towns
 Summit

Adjacent townships
 Steuben Township, Steuben County (north)
 Otsego Township, Steuben County (northeast)
 Franklin Township (east)
 Wilmington Township (southeast)
 Grant Township (south)
 Richland Township (southwest)
 Fairfield Township (west)
 Salem Township, Steuben County (northwest)

Major highways
  Interstate 69
  U.S. Route 6
  State Road 4
  State Road 427

Cemeteries
The township contains two cemeteries: Barkers Chapel and Cedar Lake.

References
 United States Census Bureau cartographic boundary files
 U.S. Board on Geographic Names

External links

 Indiana Township Association
 United Township Association of Indiana

Townships in DeKalb County, Indiana
Townships in Indiana